Western alienation, in the context of Canadian politics, refers to the notion that the Western provinces (British Columbia, Alberta, Saskatchewan and Manitoba) have been marginalized in favour of Ontario and Quebec. Those who ascribe to the sentiment believe that the latter provinces are politically over-represented and economically favoured at the expense of western Canadians.

According to analysis by Global News, Western alienation is considered especially potent in Albertan and Saskatchewanian politics. A 2019 poll by Ipsos found a historically high level of support for secession from Canada in both Alberta and Saskatchewan.

History of alienation 
Following Confederation in 1867, the first Canadian Prime Minister, Sir John A. Macdonald, announced a "National Policy" to "broaden the base of the Canadian economy and restore the confidence of Canadians in the development of their country". 

The November 1974 Canadian federal budget terminated the deduction of provincial natural resources royalties from federal tax. According to Roy Romanow, this move kicked off the "resource war", a confrontation between Pierre Trudeau's federal government and the prairie Provinces over the control and revenues from natural resources extraction and energy production.

Following a rapid increase in the price of oil between 1979 and 1980, the government of Prime Minister Pierre Trudeau introduced the National Energy Program (NEP), which intended to increase Canadian ownership in the oil industry, increase Canada's oil self-sufficiency and redistribute the wealth generated by oil production towards the federal government. The program was extremely unpopular in the west, where most of Canada's oil is produced, due to the perception that the national government was implementing unfair revenue sharing.

Current factors of alienation

Political factors 
A source of Western irritation can be traced to the Quebec sovereignty movement. Some Western Canadians argue that Quebec receives undue attention from the rest of the country due to concerns about its desire to secede from Canada or obtain sovereignty-association.

Economic factors 

In 2005, Alberta's share of equalization payments was calculated to be approximately $1.1 billion, less than what was provided, but significantly higher on a per capita basis than Ontario.  Equalization payments are made by the federal government to the "have-not" provinces.  Unlike social and health transfers, there are no restrictions over how this money is spent at the provincial level. In 2009–2010, Quebec received $8.552 billion, making it the single largest beneficiary, as it has been throughout the program's history.  In the 2009–2010 fiscal year, Ontario received an equalization payment of $347 million,

British Columbia was a "have-not" province for just over five years, ending in 2006 and 2007, when it received $459 million.

See also

 Alberta separatism
 Cascadia (independence movement)
 Maritime Rights Movement
 Maverick Party

References

Further reading

 
 
 

Political terminology in Canada
Separatism in Canada
Politics of Western Canada
Regionalism (politics)
Electoral geography